FK Spartaks is a Latvian football club that is based in Sloka, Jūrmala. In 2012, they finished 3rd in the Latvian First League championship and after winning the play-offs against JFK Olimps were promoted to the Latvian Higher League. The club plays its home matches at the Sloka Stadium with capacity of 2,500 people.

History
FK Spartaks Jūrmala were founded at the start of 2007 as participants of the third tier of Latvian football. They won the Latvian Second League championship in the first year of their existence. The next 4 seasons were spent in the Latvian First League. In 2011, the club made its greatest leap since its foundation, managing to finish the season in the third position right behind Metta/Latvijas Universitāte and Liepājas Metalurgs-2. As reserve teams were not eligible to participate in the top tier championship, Spartaks were promoted via play-offs against JFK Olimps, which they won 4–1 on aggregate. Since 2012 Spartaks Jūrmala have been playing in the Latvian Higher League. Spartaks finished their first season in the Latvian top-tier football in the fifth position of the league table, remaining in a middle-table position in the following two seasons as well, placing 7th in 2013 and 6th in 2014, respectively.

FK Spartaks have an engagement with the Jūrmala Swimming and Football School, the name of which is included in the official name of the club (Latvian: Jūrmalas Peldēšanas un Futbola skola).

From 2012 to 2014 Spartaks Jūrmala was one of two clubs representing the city in the Latvian Higher League and using the Sloka Stadium as their home-ground. After the relegation of FC Jūrmala in 2014, as of 2018 Spartaks remains as the sole representative of the coastal city in Latvian top-tier football.

Honours
 Latvian Higher League champions (2)
 2016, 2017
 Latvian Second League champions (1)
 2007
 Latvian First League play-off winners (1)
 2011
 Sports Club of the Year in Jūrmala (1)
 2011

Managers

League and Cup history

European record

Matches

Notes
 1Q: First qualifying round
 2Q: Second qualifying round
 3Q: Third qualifying round

Sponsors

Players and staff 
As of 1 November 2022

Current squad

Out on loan

Staff

References

External links
  
  of the Latvian Football Federation 

 
Sport in Jūrmala
Football clubs in Latvia
Association football clubs established in 2007
2007 establishments in Latvia